Guðmundur Oddur Magnússon (born 5 June 1955) is an Icelandic artist and professor at the Iceland Academy of the Arts' Department of Architecture and Design.

References

Place of birth missing (living people)
1955 births
Living people
Gudmundur Oddur Magnusson